Vedic may refer to:

 The Vedas, the oldest preserved Indic texts
 Vedic Sanskrit, the language of these texts
 Vedic period, during which these texts were produced
 Vedic pantheon of gods mentioned in Vedas
 The historical Vedic religion, of which the Vedas record the liturgy
 Vedic mythology, the mythological aspects of the historical Vedic religion and Vedas
 Vedanga, "auxiliary disciplines" explaining the Vedas
 Upaveda, traditional Hindu disciplines of scholarship
 Ayurveda (medicine)
 Gandharvaveda (music)
 Dhanurveda (martial arts)
 Sthaptyaveda (architecture)
 In modern usage, anything loosely related to Hindu tradition
 Hinduism in general
 Vedic science (disambiguation)
 Maharishi Vedic Approach to Health, based on Ayurveda
 Bharati Krishna Tirtha's Vedic mathematics, system of mental calculation
 Vedic University (disambiguation)
 Vedic square, multiplication table
 Vedic metal, music genre
 VE-DIC, video-enhanced differential interference contrast microscopy

See also
Veda (disambiguation)
Fifth Veda
Vedic City, Iowa, now called Maharishi Vedic City, a small settlement in Iowa, USA